Philip Moon (born November 5, 1961) is an American actor of Asian descent who has appeared primarily in television. He is best known for playing Keemo Volien Abbott in the CBS soap opera The Young and the Restless from 1994 to 1996, Mr. Lee in the TV series Deadwood (2005), and the thug Woo in the 1998 Coen brothers film The Big Lebowski. In 2007, he played the leading role in Allen Blumberg's drama film Ghosts of the Heartland. In 2011, he appeared in the "Dead Ringer" episode of CSI: Miami.

Education
Moon graduated from Hunter College and the  Institute for Advanced Theater Training. at Harvard University

Career 
Moon made his screen debut in the 1988 Catlin Adams comedy Sticky Fingers. This was followed by minor roles in the TV series As the World Turns and in Peter Wang's Hong Kong crime comedy The Laser Man in which he played a soldier. In 1991, he appeared in the series L. A. Law, 
and had minor roles in blockbuster movies such as Lethal Weapon 3 (1992) in which he played a squad member, and Batman Forever (1995) in which he played a newsreader.

In 1994, Moon appeared in the PBS miniseries Tales of the City as Lionel, the father of DeDe Halycon Day's illegitimate twins. He later portrayed Keemo Volien Abbott on the CBS soap opera The Young and the Restless from 1994 to 1996, which won him a Soap Opera Digest nomination for Outstanding Male Newcomer in 1995. Transatlantic magazine described Moon as a 6'3", muscular "soap stud" with a "soft voice" during this stint playing Abbott.

In 1997, he had a role opposite David Duchovny and Angelina Jolie in Andy Wilson's Playing God. In 1998, Moon starred alongside Jeff Bridges as Woo, one of the "Treehorn Thugs" who urinates on The Dude's rug in The Big Lebowski. He is referred to in the film by Bridges as "the Chinaman who peed on my rug", in which John Goodman prompts him that he's "Asian-American". In the late 1990s and early 2000s he had a string of roles playing police officers, including the 1998 TV movie Tempting Fate, the 1998 film Love Kills, and portraying detective Steven Nimh in the series Walker, Texas Ranger opposite Chuck Norris in 2000.

In 2004, Moon had a role as Lieutenant Jim Wong in the popular series 24, followed by a stint as Lee in the series Deadwood in which he appeared in five episodes. In 2007 he had a leading role in Allen Blumberg's drama film Ghosts of the Heartland opposite Michael Santoro and David Midthunder. In 2011 he appeared in the "Dead Ringer" episode of season 10 of CSI: Miami as Don Tillman.

Filmography

Film

Television

References

External links

1961 births
Living people
American male television actors
Hunter College alumni
Yale School of Drama alumni
21st-century American male actors